Blanka Kata Vas (born 3 September 2001) is a Hungarian professional racing cyclist, who currently rides for UCI Women's WorldTeam . She rode in the women's road race event at the 2020 UCI Road World Championships, and in the women's cross-country event at the 2020 Summer Olympics.

In June 2021, Vas joined UCI Women's WorldTeam  on a two-year contract. She previously rode for UCI Women's Continental Team .

Major results

Cyclo-cross

2017–2018
 2nd National Championships
 2nd Dolná Krupa
2018–2019
 1st  National Championships
 2nd Poprad
2019–2020
 1st  National Championships
 2nd  UCI World Under-23 Championships
 Ethias Cross
2nd Essen
 2nd Ternitz
 2nd Topolcianky
 Rectavit Series
3rd Sint-Niklaas
 3rd Podbrezová
2020–2021
 1st  National Championships
 Ethias Cross
1st Bredene
 Toi Toi Cup
1st Rýmařov
 Bryksy Cross
1st Gościęcin
 1st Gullegem
 2nd  UEC European Under-23 Championships
 3rd  UCI World Under-23 Championships
2021–2022
 1st  National Championships
 UCI World Cup
1st Overijse
3rd Iowa City
3rd Flamanville
 2nd  UEC European Championships
 X²O Badkamers Trophy
3rd Koppenberg
2022–2023
 1st  National Championships
 1st Ardooie
 1st Woerden
 Toi Toi Cup
1st Holé Vrchy
1st Hlinsko
1st Jičín
 2nd Oisterwijk
 3rd  UEC European Championships

Road

2018
 Youth Olympic Games
1st  Criterium
3rd  Girls' combined
2019
 National Junior Championships
1st  Road race
2nd Time trial
 V4 Ladies Series
6th Restart Zalaegerszeg
10th Pannonhalma
 7th Road race, UCI World Junior Championships
2020
 National Championships
1st  Time trial
2nd Road race
 5th Trophée des Grimpeuses
 6th Road race, UEC European Under-23 Championships
 7th Grand Prix International d'Isbergues
2021
 National Championships
1st  Time trial
1st  Road race
 2nd  Road race, UEC European Under-23 Championships
 4th Road race, UCI World Championships
 9th Overall Challenge by La Vuelta
2022
 National Championships
1st  Time trial
1st  Road race

Mountain Bike

 2020
 National Championships
1st  Marathon
1st  Cross-country
 2nd  Cross-country, UCI World Under-23 Championships
2021
 UCI Under-23 XCO World Cup
2nd Leogang
3rd Albstadt
3rd Nové Město
 Slovak Cup
1st Drozdovo
 IZOMAT MTB Cup
1st Zadov
 4th Cross-country, Olympic Games

References

External links
 
 Blanka Kata Vas at Cyclocross24.

2001 births
Living people
Hungarian female cyclists
Cyclists from Budapest
Cyclists at the 2018 Summer Youth Olympics
Cyclists at the 2020 Summer Olympics
Olympic cyclists of Hungary
Cyclo-cross cyclists
21st-century Hungarian women